Rana Abdul Shakoor Khan (born 9 June 1956) is a Pakistani lawyer Deputy Attorney-General-I Lahore.

Early life
He was born on 9 June 1956. He is a Pakistani lawyer Deputy Attorney-General-I Lahore.

Political career
He ran for the seat of the National Assembly of Pakistan as a candidate of Pakistan Peoples Party Parliamentarians (PPP) from Constituency NA-141 (Kasur-IV) in 2008 Pakistani general election but was unsuccessful. He received 	20,084 votes and lost the seat to Rana Muhammad Ishaq.

.

References

Living people
1956 births
Pakistani MNAs 2008–2013